The Neo Phaliron Velodrome (New Phaleron) was a velodrome and sports arena in the Neo Faliro District of Piraeus, Greece, used for the cycling events at the Athens 1896 Summer Olympics.  The property was donated by the Athens-Piraeus train company to the Hellenic Olympic Committee. It became the home of two football clubs which expanded into more sports: Ethnikos Piraeus (1923) and Olympiacos CFP (1925).

The venue was enlarged in 1964 and named after Georgios Karaiskakis, a Greek military commander and a leader of the Greek War of Independence, who died nearby the stadium. The second stadium hosted the 1969 European Athletics Championships and the 1971 UEFA Cup Winners' Cup Final.

Georgios Karaiskakis Stadium was completely rebuilt in 2004, when it hosted several games of the football tournament in the 2004 Summer Olympics, including the Women's Gold medal match. In 2022, it is the second largest football venue in Greece with a capacity of 32,115 spectators. It's the home of football club Olympiacos F.C.

References

Notes

External links
1896 Summer Olympics official report. pp. 74–75 in Volume II, but shown as pp. 194–95 in pdf file for 27 March 1896 in report and pp. 97–99 in Volume II, but shown as pp. 217–9 in pdf file for 30 March 1896.

Sports venues completed in 1896
Venues of the 1896 Summer Olympics
Defunct sports venues in Greece
Former buildings and structures in Greece
Velodromes in Greece
Cycle racing in Greece
Olympic cycling venues